California is an area of the town of Ipswich, in the Ipswich district, in the county of Suffolk, England, which was developed by the Ipswich and Suffolk Freehold Land Society (FLS) in the mid nineteenth century. The FLS was founded in 1849, the year of the California gold rush. This gave rise to the nickname of the area which was originally called the Cauldwell Hall Estate.

The Derby Road railway station is located in southern California.

References

Ipswich Districts